DeMossville (or De Mossville) is an unincorporated community in Pendleton County, Kentucky, United States. It is situated along the Licking River, approximately thirty-five miles south of Cincinnati, Ohio. DeMossville has a post office with the ZIP code 41033.

The community was settled in 1852 and is named for the DeMoss family, of which Peter DeMoss, a French immigrant and veteran of the Revolutionary War, may have come to America with Lafayette.

References

External links

Unincorporated communities in Pendleton County, Kentucky
Unincorporated communities in Kentucky